Transportation in the Las Vegas Valley including the cities of Las Vegas, North Las Vegas and Henderson is a multi-faceted system. The street system is mostly laid out in a north-south/east-west system of roads.  While most residents rely on cars, there is an extensive network of bus routes reaching many areas of the county. The Las Vegas Valley, being the one of the largest tourist destinations in the world, has a mass transportation system which favors the Las Vegas Strip.

Many proposals have been made to expand the transportation system in the Las Vegas Valley including commuter rail and rapid transit.

History
Before Las Vegas became a tourist destination, railroads were a major industry in southern Nevada. The Los Angeles and Salt Lake Railroad was the first to lay track in the Las Vegas Valley. By 1905 the Los Angeles and Salt Lake had connected Salt Lake City to Southern California through Las Vegas. The railroad provided freight and passenger service to Las Vegas until it was acquired by the Union Pacific Railroad in 1921.

The Union Pacific Railroad began the City of Los Angeles between Chicago and Los Angeles in 1936. This train ran until it was combined with the City of San Francisco in 1960. In 1956 the City of Las Vegas began between Los Angeles and Las Vegas. The train was renamed the Las Vegas Holiday Special and ran until it was discontinued in 1968. Amtrak operated the Las Vegas Limited between Las Vegas and Los Angeles for three months in 1976. A new service, the Desert Wind, began in 1979.

The Desert Wind operated on Union Pacific tracks between Salt Lake City Denver & Rio Grande Depot and Los Angeles Union Station with a stop at the Las Vegas Amtrak station. The Desert Wind faced fierce competition from airlines and the interstate highway system. This, along with frequent delays caused by UP freight trains, made the Desert Wind unpopular. It was discontinued in 1997 and replaced by Amtrak's Thruway Motorcoach.

Current service and future plans
Currently, Amtrak Thruway Motorcoach serves Las Vegas with a bus stop at Harry Reid International and a bus stop in Downtown Las Vegas. There has been no commercial passenger rail service since the discontinuation of the Desert Wind in 1997. The Southern Nevada Railway operates excursion trips on former UP tracks in Boulder City. Amtrak plans for restoration of Las Vegas rail service surfaced almost immediately after the discontinuation of the Desert Wind. These plans recommended using Talgo trains between Los Angeles and Las Vegas, similar to Amtrak's Cascades route in the Pacific Northwest. This plan was never implemented and Las Vegas went without passenger rail service. Las Vegas is one of the largest metro areas in the US without passenger rail service.

In 2005 DesertXpress Enterprises LLC was formed in an attempt to restore passenger rail service to Las Vegas. They officially released their plan to construct a high-speed route to SoCal later that year. In 2009, after years of environmental reports, determining right of way, and debating over what federal agency would have regulatory authority, Secretary of Transportation Ray LaHood announced the official recognition of DesertXpress as a high-speed route.

In early 2011, DesertXpress applied for a federal, $5 billion loan through the FRAs RRIF. If approved this would be the largest single amount loaned out since the program began. This contradicted original statements made by DesertXpress Enterprises, that they would not use any tax payer funds. This loan request came months before the final EIS was approved.

The terminus of this line, Victorville, has been criticized due to its distance from Downtown Los Angeles, the place long considered to be the prime location for any high-speed rail terminal. Victorville, approximately 85 miles from Los Angeles, was chosen due to the exponential cost of building high-speed rail infrastructure in urban areas, such as the Los Angeles metropolitan area.

A competing company, Las Vegas Railway Express, also plans to begin passenger rail service between Las Vegas and Southern California, though at lower speeds.

Airports 

Currently, the easiest, and most used method for traveling in and out of the Las Vegas Valley is by air. Harry Reid International Airport, the world's ninth busiest airport by traffic movements, is five miles from downtown Las Vegas, and is the only commercial airport serving the Las Vegas Valley. It serves as a "focus city" for Southwest Airlines, the largest operator in Las Vegas. Harry Reid consists of two terminals with a third under construction. Terminal One is used for domestic flights to and from other US cities. It contains 96 gates in four concourses.  Terminal Three opened in June 2012, and added an additional fourteen gates, seven of which are to be used for international travelers to and from London, Mexico City, Frankfurt, Seoul, Toronto, Vancouver, Amsterdam and Paris (seasonally).

Transportation to and from the airport is currently limited to automobiles, taxis, shuttles and buses. In late 2007 Clark County commissioners gave permission to the Las Vegas Monorail Company for an extension to Harry Reid International International Terminal One although funding had yet to be determined. The extension was met with negativity by limo and taxi companies that had previously been the major transportation providers for arriving tourists. By 2011, funding was in doubt and the Las Vegas Monorail Company had yet to begin construction.

Other airports in the Las Vegas Valley include the North Las Vegas Airport, a noncommercial airport used mostly by hobbyist pilots and small charter airlines, and Henderson Executive Airport, a noncommercial airport used mostly by business jets, and small charter airlines. A second, larger commercial airport is planned. Ivanpah Valley Airport, as it is known, is a developing relief airport between Primm and Sloan. However, as of August 2011, due to the economic downturn and lack of demand increase, the airport has been put on temporary hold and is still in the design phase.

Bus 

The Regional Transportation Commission (RTC) operates the following bus services;
 The Deuce
 Strip and Downtown Express (SDX)
 Boulder Highway Express (BHX)
 Sahara Express (SX)
 The Max
 Henderson and Downtown Express

Self-driving shuttle 

In January 2017, the city of Las Vegas, fleet logistics provider, Keolis North America, and the shuttle manufacturer Navya SAS, partnered to test a driverless shuttle in Downtown Las Vegas on Fremont Street between Las Vegas Boulevard and Eighth Street. The Navya shuttle comes equipped with LiDAR technology, GPS, cameras and odometry. Keolis is the transportation operator for the Regional Transportation Commission of Southern Nevada and has been operating fixed route local and express transit routes in the region since 2013.

The pilot test, which ran from January 11–20, 2017, is part of Las Vegas' broader efforts to create a designated area in the city's urban center for testing autonomous and connected cars. The city of Las Vegas was honored with a Smart 50 Award for this initiative.

The shuttle was further sponsored for one year, from November 2017 to November 2018. This second pilot program gained international notoriety on launch day not only for the first connected infrastructure, but also because an 18-wheeler delivery truck backed into the shuttle within hours of its launch. The official City of Las Vegas statement:
“The autonomous shuttle was testing today when it was grazed by a delivery truck downtown. The shuttle did what it was supposed to do, in that it’s sensors registered the truck and the shuttle stopped to avoid the accident. Unfortunately the delivery truck did not stop and grazed the front fender of the shuttle. Had the truck had the same sensing equipment that the shuttle has the accident would have been avoided. Testing of the shuttle will continue during the 12-month pilot in the downtown Innovation District. The shuttle will remain out of service for the rest of the day. The driver of the truck was cited by Metro.”

Rail

Intercity rail

Monorail 

Unlike other monorails which traditionally serve as short line people movers (such as the Mexico City International Airport Monorail or the Walt Disney World Monorail System), the Las Vegas Monorail is the primary rapid transit system in Las Vegas. It is operated by Regional Transit Corporation of South Nevada (RTC transit). It was built primarily as a tourist transit system, and exclusively serves the Las Vegas Strip. The system served more than five million people in 2010. Although ridership has declined, it still remains a key piece of the Las  Vegas transportation system.

The system was conceived in 1993 as a connection between the MGM Grand and Bally's Las Vegas. It was completed, after many delays, in the summer of 2004 with the completion of what is known as "Phase One" of the monorail. The monorail runs between the MGM Grand and the SLS which opened in August 2014 replacing the Sahara Casino.

Resort trams 
Resort trams are not operated by RTC Transit but by the resorts. The lines all run the east side of the strip and all are free of fare payment.

Roads

Walking 

Downtown Las Vegas is considered very walkable including the strip. Ride attractions such as gondolas at the Grand Canal Shoppes also exist. Lots of elevated walkways exist between casinos but the Walk Score is only 41.

See also

References

 
 
Las Vegas, Nevada